Low Spirit Recordings was a German techno record label.

History 
Founded in 1986 by Maximilian Lenz (Westbam), Fabian Lenz (DJ Dick), William Röttger, Klaus Jankuhn and Sandra Molzahn. The first record was WestBam's 17 - This Is Not a Boris Becker Song which reached #1 in the Berlin dance music hitlist. Low Spirit became acquainted with the Love Parade event from its early years and the theme for its 1997 event, titled Sonic Empire, has reached the top of the German single charts. The label was later praised for "having made German techno history" by "Raveline" magazine.

In the 1990s, Low Spirit was also owner of the event Mayday. The label was shut down and all future distributions by Low Spirit were taken over by Kontor Records in 2007.

Artists
CIRC
DJ Dick
Eastbam
Genlog
Hardy Hard 
Lexy & K-Paul
L.U.P.O.
Marc de Clarq
Mark 'Oh
Marusha
Members of Mayday
Miss Kittin & The Hacker
Mr.X and Mr.Y
Die Raketen
Raver's Nature
RMB
Tanith (DJ)
WestBam

External links
 Label-Website
 Low Spirit on discogs.com

Defunct record labels of Germany
Techno record labels